Tung Padevat ("Revolutionary Flag") was a Khmer-language journal in Cambodia. Tung Padevat was one of the theoretical organs of the Communist Party of Kampuchea. The first issue was published in January 1975. It was published monthly at least until September 1978. There were also several 'special issues' published.

Format
Throughout its period of publishing, the magazine had a uniform format. Most issues ranged between 65-85 pages. The September and October/November issues of 1977 contained 133 pages. The April 1977 issue, on the other hand, had only 29 pages.

References

Communist magazines
Defunct magazines published in Cambodia
Defunct political magazines
Magazines established in 1975
Magazines disestablished in 1978
Monthly magazines
Magazines published in Cambodia